Yank Azman (born October 19, 1947) is a Canadian television and film actor.

Early life
Azman was born in a displaced persons camp in Bad Wörishofen, Germany to Cesia (née Waishand), a sales clerk, and Kuba Zajfman, a tailor and furrier, Holocaust survivors  from Chmielnik, Poland. They emigrated to Canada in 1948 and settled in Toronto where he attended Harbord Collegiate Institute, William Lyon Mackenzie Collegiate Institute and later the Ontario College of Art (now known as OCAD University) and the University of Toronto.

Career
Although his first stage appearance was at age six, his professional acting career began with the CBC Television series Toby in 1968. By the 1970s after training at Young People's Theatre and The Second City, he was working in improvisational and children's theatre with Gilda Radner and in 1974 was cast as one of an ensemble (which included Valri Bromfield and Jayne Eastwood) to star on the CTV comedy series Funny Farm. During the 1970s he appeared on stage at: Factory Theatre's Hurray for Johnny Canuck with Maury Chaykin and Jim Henshaw; Theatre Passe Muraille in Bethune; and Theatre New Brunswick as Brighella in Goldoni's Servant of Two Masters among others. Since then he has worked steadily in film and television with such roles as Tom Shaughnessy on My Life as A Dog and frequent guest appearances on such shows as Murdoch Mysteries.

Second career
He began a lifelong interest in art and antiques after being inspired by Painters Eleven artist Harold Town while working together on the Canadian Centennial project at William Lyon Mackenzie C.I. In 1979, he started supplying antiques as props for the movies and to retail stores such as Polo Ralph Lauren and then opened a shop at the Harbourfront Antique Market. Toronto Life Magazine called him the "friendliest dealer in town." He has made numerous guest appearances as an antiques expert on such television shows as Room Service with Sarah Richardson on HGTV, Breakfast Television on Citytv and in 2002 he hosted a television pilot called Flea Market Millionaire for the Discovery Channel.
Azman has also lectured on antiques at the CITT (Canadian Institute of Theatre Technology) at Ryerson University (now Toronto Metropolitan University) and on Material Culture at the Faculty of Liberal Studies at Ontario College of Art & Design.

Voice acting
Azman has long worked as a voice actor and has voiced several characters in animated series such as Starcom: The U.S. Space Force and The Adventures of Tintin.

Personal life
Azman is married to Canadian artist & antique dealer Pulver Zajfman and lives in Toronto and Miami Beach. He is a member of Mensa and has a mild form of dyscalculia.

Filmography

References

External links
 

1947 births
Canadian male film actors
Canadian male television actors
Canadian male voice actors
Canadian male stage actors
Canadian television personalities
Comedians from Toronto
Male actors from Toronto
Canadian people of Polish-Jewish descent
Living people
OCAD University alumni
Mensans
Canadian sketch comedians